Hendricus Peter (Henk) Bremmer (17 May 1871, Leiden – 10 January 1956, The Hague) was a Dutch painter, art critic, art teacher, collector and art dealer. He was the father of the painter Rudolph Bremmer (1900–1993).

Bremmer  trained as a painter and artist, working in journalism from 1893–1895 and began teaching art in 1896. In the 1906-1907 season, Helene Kröller-Müller, then one of the richest women in the Netherlands, was his pupil and she soon began collecting art. Bremmer advised her to put together a collection, later forming the basis of the Kröller-Müller Museum. He also advised Hugo Tutein Nolthenius who kept of bust of him in his collection.

Bremmer had contact with many artists. He lived from 1902 until his death in Artiestenhof in The Hague. In 1912 he came into contact with Bart van der Leck, providing financial support and a monthly allowance.

In 1906 he published the art critique Eene inleiding tot het zien van beeldende kunst. In 1913 he started a magazine of fine arts Bremmer had so much influence in Dutch art in the first half of the 20th century that he was called the "Art Pope". From 14 October 2006 to February 25, 2007 an exhibition on Bremmer, entitled The Art Tsar, H.P. Bremmer. was held at the Kröller-Müller Museum in Otterlo.

References

External links
 

1871 births
1956 deaths
Dutch art critics
Dutch art collectors
Dutch art dealers
Artists from Leiden
20th-century Dutch painters
Dutch male painters
20th-century Dutch male artists